The Scottish Highlander is a boutique hotel barge cruising the Caledonian Canal in Scotland, from Inverness to Fort William.  She is a Luxe motor Dutch steel barge. She is a member of the fleet of hotel barges owned by European Waterways.

History

She was built in 1931, by Gebroeders Van Zutphen, in Vreeswijk, the Netherlands as a trading barge.  She was christened the Vertrouwen, meaning "trust" in Dutch.  She served as a trading barge for her first 60 years, transporting grain and various commodities throughout the Netherlands.

In 1991, she was purchased by J.P. Leisure Limited. After a renovation in the Netherlands she sailed  to Inverness in April 1993 to begin her career as a passenger ship.

In 1999 she was purchased by Derek Banks to become part of the European Waterways fleet of hotel barges. From 1999 to 2000 she was completely renovated and was renamed Scottish Highlander. She was refurbished again in 2006.

As a working hotel barge she cruises in Scotland on the Caledonian Canal with up to 8 passengers.  She has four passenger cabins, three crew cabins, and a saloon.

She is crewed by a captain, tour guide, chef and housekeeper.

References

External links
European Waterways Website

Hotel barges
Loch Ness
Barges
1931 ships
Hotels established in 2000
1931 establishments in the Netherlands
2000 establishments in Scotland
Hotels in Highland (council area)